South Northamptonshire was, from 1974 to 2021, a district in Northamptonshire, England. Its council was based in the town of Towcester, first established as a settlement in Roman Britain. The population of the Local Authority District Council in 2011 was 85,189.

The largest town in the district was Brackley, which had a population of 14,000 in 2008 followed by Towcester which has a population of nearly 10,000. Other significant settlements in size included Deanshanger, Bugbrooke, Roade, King's Sutton, Silverstone and Middleton Cheney.  Many of the villages listed have populations exceeding 1000.

Geography

Elevations and shape
The northern half of the district was generally higher than the south, reaching 192m AOD northeast of the centre of Aston-le-Walls, and 182m on the road east of Culworth, a village which also rests on top of the ridge following the general WSW line of the county and of the district but except for this is north of the district.  This ridge is part of the Jurassic Way. Lower parts are at 85m AOD (above mean sea level) in the southwest corner and  AOD in the northeast.

The district was shaped approximately like the Christian cross in an ENE orientation extending from its top at the southeast of Northampton and reaching to a north–south line south-by-southeast of Banbury, Oxfordshire.  An additional arm near its foot reached north through the large village of Chipping Warden to Upper Boddington.

Soil and geology
Land was taken up with for the most part with arable agriculture peppered by villages, however allows space for two towns of significant size.  Supporting this  is a regular interspersion of two high fertility types of soil for most plants and crops: freely draining slightly acid but base-rich; and lime-rich loamy and clayey soils with impeded drainage soils, on a default (generally slightly lower) soil of slowly permeable seasonally wet slightly acid but base-rich loamy and clayey soils (of medium fertility).  The district in terms of watercourses had sources and headwaters of the rivers Cherwell, Great Ouse and Nene.

Whittlewood Forest
Whittlewood Forest occupies a modest area for a forest and is broken up by fields (in the southern arm close to Milton Keynes which reaches to the Great Ouse) and this surrounds Whittlebury, the fields south of the upland village of Paulerspury on straight, Roman Watling Street which passes through the forest.  This lies between Silverstone and Potterspury (also with a conservation area on Watling Street) or equally between Deanshanger and Towcester.

Demography and human geography
With just over 79,293 people in 2000 and 91,000 in 2008, a 14.8% increase.

The growth in population between 2001 and 2007 was the third largest of all districts in the country and consisted of 35,700 households.

The district was notable for the proportion of and growth in detached houses, and the district was one of a tiny proportion to have seen a growth in the proportion of this type of home relative to other types between 2001 and 2011.

History
The district was formed on 1 April 1974, under the Local Government Act 1972, and was a merger of the municipal borough of Brackley, along with Brackley Rural District, Towcester Rural District, and part of Northampton Rural District.

Abolition and replacement
In March 2018 at Northamptonshire County Council, following financial and cultural mismanagement by the cabinet and officers, the then Secretary of State for Local Government, Sajid Javid, sent commissioner Max Caller into the council, who recommended the county council and all district and borough councils in the county be abolished, and replaced by two unitary authorities, one covering the West, and one the North of the county. These proposals were approved in April 2019. It meant that the districts of Daventry, Northampton and South Northamptonshire were merged to form a new unitary authority called West Northamptonshire, whilst the second unitary authority North Northamptonshire consists of Corby, East Northamptonshire, Kettering and Wellingborough districts. These new authorities came into being on 1 April 2021. Elections for the new authorities were due to be held on 7 May 2020, but were delayed due to the COVID-19 pandemic.

Settlements and parishes
For a county-wide list for Northamptonshire see List of places in Northamptonshire

Abthorpe, Adstone, Ashton, Aston le Walls, Astrop, Aynho
Blakesley, Blisworth, Boddington, Brackley, Bradden, Brafield-on-the-Green, Bugbrooke
Caldecote, Castle Ashby, Chacombe, Charlton, Chipping Warden, Cogenhoe, Cold Higham, Cosgrove, Courteenhall, Croughton, Culworth
Deanshanger, Denton
Easton Neston, Edgcote, Evenley, Eydon
Farthinghoe
Gayton, Grafton Regis, Grange Park, Greatworth, Greens Norton, Grimscote
Hackleton, Harpole, Hartwell, Helmdon, Hinton-in-the-Hedges
King's Sutton, Kislingbury
Litchborough, Little Houghton
Maidford, Marston St Lawrence, Middleton Cheney, Milton Malsor, Moreton Pinkney
Nether Heyford, Newbottle
Old Stratford, Overthorpe
Pattishall, Paulerspury, Potterspury
Quinton
Radstone, Roade, Rothersthorpe
Shutlanger, Silverstone, Slapton, Stoke Bruerne, Sulgrave, Syresham
Thenford, Thorpe Mandeville, Tiffield, Towcester
Upper Heyford
Wappenham, Warkworth, Weedon Lois, Weston, Whiston, Whitfield, Whittlebury, Wicken, Woodend
Yardley Gobion, Yardley Hastings

Gallery

Museum
Towcester Museum

Arms

See also

 South Northamptonshire local elections
 Grade I listed buildings in South Northamptonshire
 Grade II* listed buildings in South Northamptonshire

Notes and references
Notes
  
References

 
Former non-metropolitan districts
Non-metropolitan districts of Northamptonshire
2021 disestablishments in England
West Northamptonshire District